Archo is a rural locality (a selo) in Akhvakhsky District, Republic of Dagestan, Russia. The population was 347 as of 2010.

Geography 
Archo is located 3 km west of Karata (the district's administrative centre) by road. Mashtada is the nearest rural locality.

References 

Rural localities in Akhvakhsky District